Valerie Daggett is a professor of bioengineering at the University of Washington in Seattle, Washington, United States.

Education and career 
Daggett has a B.S. from Reed College. She received her Ph.D. from the University of California, San Francisco, advised by Irwin Kuntz and Peter Kollman, and subsequently held a postdoctoral position at Stanford University with Michael Levitt, a co-recipient of the 2013 Nobel Prize in Chemistry.

As of 2021, she is also the chief executive officer of AltPep, a biomedical startup that was a spinoff from her research at the University of Washington.

Research 
Her laboratory focuses on work in molecular dynamics simulations of proteins and other biomolecules. Daggett is well known for large-scale simulations of protein folding, especially unfolding, and native state dynamics through her "dynameomics" project.

Awards and honors 
In 2011, Daggett was named a fellow of the Biophysical Society. Daggett was one of two University of Washington scientists named 2015 American Institute for Medical and Biological Engineering fellows.

References

External links
 Daggett Laboratory website

21st-century American biologists
21st-century American women scientists
American women biochemists
American women biologists
Fellows of the American Institute for Medical and Biological Engineering
Living people
Year of birth missing (living people)